Irina Vyguzova (born 26 June 1974) is a Kazakhstani diver. She competed at the 1996 Summer Olympics and the 2000 Summer Olympics.

References

External links
 

1974 births
Living people
Kazakhstani female divers
Olympic divers of Kazakhstan
Divers at the 1996 Summer Olympics
Divers at the 2000 Summer Olympics
Sportspeople from Almaty
Asian Games medalists in diving
Divers at the 1994 Asian Games
Divers at the 1998 Asian Games
Asian Games bronze medalists for Kazakhstan
Medalists at the 1998 Asian Games
21st-century Kazakhstani women